Stony Heap is a hamlet in County Durham, in England. It is situated between Leadgate and Annfield Plain. There used to be 6 houses and 2 farms plus the pit, now there is 1 house and 1 farm.

References

Hamlets in County Durham
Consett